A Modern Cinderella is a 1917 American silent drama film directed by John G. Adolfi and starring June Caprice, Frank Morgan and Betty Prendergast.

Cast
 June Caprice as Joyce 
 Frank Morgan as Tom 
 Betty Prendergast as Polly 
 Stanhope Wheatcroft as Harry 
 Grace Stevens as Mother 
 Tom Brooke as Father

References

Bibliography
 Solomon, Aubrey. The Fox Film Corporation, 1915-1935: A History and Filmography. McFarland, 2011.

External links

1917 films
1917 drama films
Silent American drama films
Films directed by John G. Adolfi
American silent feature films
1910s English-language films
American black-and-white films
Fox Film films
1910s American films